Success Lake is a man-made lake within Colliers Mills Wildlife Management Area in Jackson Township, Ocean County, New Jersey, United States.

The lake is accessible only through rutted sandy roads. In January 2020, a location error on a Waze advertisement led numerous travelers intending to go to the Borgata in Atlantic City to get trapped on the roads leading to the lake.

References

Reservoirs in New Jersey
Bodies of water of Ocean County, New Jersey
Jackson Township, New Jersey